Dar al-Islam is a Muslim educational center located near Abiquiú, New Mexico, US.

History
It was the first planned Islamic community in the United States. It was originally co-founded in 1979 by Nuridin Durkee, an American who had converted to Islam; Sahl Kabbani, a Saudi businessman; and Abdullah Omar Nasseef, a former secretary-general of the World Muslim League. Kabbani reportedly contributed $125,000 to the non-profit Lama Foundation that was formed to create the community, while the bulk of the start up funds were said to have come from the Riyadh Ladies’ Benevolent Association of Saudi Arabia, and several daughters of the late Khalid bin Abdulaziz Al Saud.

The foundation purchased its first  site from Alva Simpson, a well-established rancher along the Chama, for $1,372,000.

At its height, the community served some 60 students, employed seven full-time teachers, and partially supported itself through resident entrepreneurial efforts. By 1990, however, the project was suffering from attrition. Although it never fully achieved its original intent as a residential community for American Muslims, it did succeed in remaining viable as an educational facility. Today it provides religious instruction, retreats and camps for its residents and other Muslims, as well as teaching workshops on Islam for public and private institutions.

Architecture
The mosque and madrasa (religious school) were designed by the Egyptian architect Hassan Fathy and were constructed of adobe. The main buildings were completed in 1981, and Dar al-Islam opened in 1982.

References

Sources

External links 

 Has pictures of Fathy's work at Dar Al-Islam.

1979 establishments in New Mexico
Intentional communities in the United States
Islamic organizations based in the United States
Mosques in New Mexico
Organizations based in New Mexico
Religion in New Mexico
Rio Arriba County, New Mexico
Mosques completed in 1981